Mathilde of Hesse (4 July 1473 in Blankenstein – 19 February 1505 in Cologne) was a Landrave princess from birth and became the Duchess of Cleves and Countess of La Marck through her marriage to John II, Duke of Cleves in 1489 until her death. She was the daughter of Henry III, Landgrave of Upper Hesse (1441-1483) and his wife Anna of Katzenelnbogen (1443-1494).
She is notable for being the grandmother to Anne of Cleves the fourth wife of King Henry VIII of England.

Early life and family
Mathilde was born on 4 July 1473 into the Hesse noble family, was the younger daughter of  Henry III, Landgrave of Upper Hesse  and his wife, Anna of Katzenelnbogen the daughter of Philipp I, Count of Katzenelnbogen and his first wife, Anna of Württemberg. Her father earned an extreme amount of wealth and territories due to his marriage to Mathilde's mother Anna, and gained the nickname "the Rich". She became an heiress to the County of Katzenelnbogen after the death of her father in 1479. A dispute later developed around this inheritance, which was also called the "Katzenelnbogischen succession dispute". At the end, Mathilde's brother William benefited from the inheritance.

Mathilde also had five siblings. They were:
Frederick (died young).
Ludwig III (1460-1478). Never married and died without issue.
Elisabeth of Hesse-Marburg (1466–1523). She married John V, Count of Nassau-Siegen and had six children.
William III, Landgrave of Hesse (1471-1500). Married Elisabeth and died without heirs.
Heinrich (died young).

Marriage and issue 
Mathilde's parents, like their older sister Elisabeth, tried to secure the Katzenelnbogen legacy with an early marriage policy. In the summer of 1481, she was engaged to John of Cleves, and the marriage was scheduled for 1485. However, it took place on 3 November 1489, after Pope Innocent VIII had awarded Duke John the Golden Rose of Virtue on 15 April 1489 . This is remarkable in light of the fact that John, with his alleged 63 illegitimate children, had the dubious reputation of being a "child maker". From then on, John called himself "Johann von Kleve, Count of La Marck and Katzenelnbogen".
She married on 3 November 1489 in Soest to John II, Duke of Cleves.  He was son of John I, Duke of Cleves and Elizabeth of Nevers. The marriage produced three known children:

 John (1490–1539), succeeded as Duke of Cleves and Count of the Marck
 Anna (1495–1567), married in 1518 with count Philip III of Waldeck-Eisenberg
 Adolf (1498–1525), appointed by his father's cousin Philip of Cleves, Lord of Ravenstein and Wijnendale, as his successor, but died before Philip did in 1528

Death and burial
Mathilde died on 19 February 1505 from unknown causes at the young age of 31 in Cologne. She was laid to rest in Stiftskirche Kleve where her husband would be buried much later.

Prayer book origins
The Munich State Library (Cod. Germ. 84) contains the "Prayer Book of Sybille von Kleve", dated 1526. In his research, the art historian  Eberhard Schenk zu Schweinsberg, based on an identical prayer book (on loan from the Cologne canon Valentin Engelhart von Geltersheym in the research library) proves that both prayer books come from a Cologne workshop. He states that only Mathilde could have been the first owner of the prayer book.snd that after her death, it was passed down to her granddaughter  Sibylle of Cleves as a wedding present.

Ancestry

References

Sources
Boltanski, Ariane (2006). Les ducs de Nevers et l'État royal: genèse d'un compromis (ca 1550 - ca 1600) (in French). Librairie Droz S.A.

1473 births
1505 deaths
House of Hesse
Duchesses of Cleves
15th-century German people
15th-century German women
Daughters of monarchs